Kevin Alexander Londoño Asprilla (born 23 November 1993), commonly known as Kevin Londoño, is a Colombian footballer who plays as a midfielder.

References

External links
 

1993 births
Living people
Colombian footballers
Colombian expatriate footballers
Leones F.C. footballers
Fortaleza C.E.I.F. footballers
Águilas Doradas Rionegro players
Jaguares de Córdoba footballers
Once Caldas footballers
Hatta Club players
Categoría Primera A players
Categoría Primera B players
UAE Pro League players
Association football midfielders
Expatriate footballers in the United Arab Emirates
Place of birth missing (living people)
Sportspeople from Antioquia Department